Kentucky Route 645 (KY 645) is a  state highway in eastern Kentucky that runs from U.S. Route 23 (US 23) northeast of Ulysses to, temporarily, a dead end east of KY 40 southeast of Inez.

Future
An extension of the highway is planned east of KY 40  to Warfield. While previous information indicated the KY 40 designation for the new highway, the mileage for KY 645 continues past KY 40.

Major intersections

References

0645
0645
0645